Myron T. Tribus (October 30, 1921 – August 31, 2016) was an American organizational theorist, who was the director of the Center for Advanced Engineering Study at MIT from 1974 to 1986. He was known as leading supporter and interpreter of W. Edwards Deming, for popularizing the Bayesian methods, and for coining the term "thermoeconomics".

Early life
Myron T. Tribus was born in San Francisco, California, on October 30, 1921 to Edward Lefkowitz and Marie Kramer. His father died in World War I and his mother, a short-hand typist, remarried to Julius Tribus. He graduated in 1942 from the University of California, Berkeley with a Bachelor of Science in chemistry, and received his Ph.D in engineering in 1949 from the University of California, Los Angeles.

Career
Tribus was a captain in the U.S. Air Force during World War II, and worked as a design-development officer at Wright Field. While in the Air Force, he developed thermal ice protection equipment for aircraft.

He joined General Electric in 1949 and became a gas turbine design engineer, but was unhappy in industry. He returned to academia, joining the faculty of University of California, Los Angeles (UCLA), where he taught thermodynamics, fluid mechanics, and heat transfer.  He was a visiting assistant professor of chemical engineering and director of icing research at the University of Michigan between 1952 and 1954. While at UCLA, he hosted Threshold, an hour long television program dealing with science and its impact on society. It aired on CBS in 1958.

In 1961, he was named dean of Thayer School of Engineering at Dartmouth College, where he led the faculty in developing a new curriculum based on engineering design and entrepreneurship. He believed that hands-on engineering design was essential at all levels of the curriculum, saying, "Knowledge without know-how is sterile." He remained in the role until 1969.

In 1969, Tribus accepted a political appointee post in the Richard M. Nixon administration as Assistant Secretary of Commerce for Science and Technology. On November 23, 1970, he left the Department of Commerce after 18 months to become Senior Vice President for Research & Engineering in Xerox Corp. From 1974 to 1986, Tribus directed the Center for Advanced Engineering Study at Massachusetts Institute of Technology. During his tenure, the Center published W. Edwards Deming's groundbreaking book, Out of the Crisis. He helped expand the Center's Video Course Program, a precursor of MIT Professional Education. He also helped to increase enrollment in the Center's Advanced Study Program.

Tribus was a co-founder of Exergy Inc., a company specializing in the design of advanced, high-efficiency power production systems. In his later years, he focused on the theory of structural cognitive modifiability of Reuven Feuerstein, an Israeli psychologist.

Research
Tribus research interests ranged from academic subjects such as heat transfer, fluid mechanics, probability theory, statistical inference, and thermodynamics, to applied topics such as sea water demineralization, aircraft heating, aircraft ice prevention, and the design of engineering curricula. He also had a strong influence concerning the domains of industrial quality, ergonomics, and education.

Tribus was a leading supporter and interpreter of W. Edwards Deming. He is also known in the 1970s for an insightful book entitled Rational Descriptions, Decisions and Designs, which popularized Bayesian methods with examples. In the 1960s, Tribus coined the term "thermoeconomics".

Perversity Principle
Myron Tribus, "Perversity Principle":  
"If you try to improve the performance of a system of people, machines, and procedures by setting numerical goals for the improvement of individual parts of the system, the system will defeat your efforts and you will pay a price where you least expect it.".

This idea was close to a quotation by Paul Valéry about the spontaneous creation of counter-measures defeating measures, 

It was reformulated by Stephen Covey as, "Whoever tries to manage his business only looking at figures will soon not have anymore the figures nor the business."

Personal life
Tribus married Cora "Sue" Davis, who he met during the war. Together, they had two daughters: Kamala and Lou Andreas.

Death
Tribus died on August 31, 2016.

Legacy and honors
 Elected member of the National Academy of Engineering in 1973, under Special Fields & Interdisciplinary Engineering, for his contributions to applied sciences that support engineering, to engineering education, and for professional service in education, government, and industry.
 Thurman H. Bane award
 Society of Automotive Engineers's Wright Brothers Medal, 1945
 American Society of Civil Engineers's Alfred Noble Prize as a joint award from seven societies for his work developing a thermal ice protection system for aircraft, 1952. 
 UCLA's Engineering Alumnus of the Year, 1971–1972
 American Statistical Association's Deming Lecturer Award in 1998 for "The Contributions of W. Edwards Deming to the Improvement of Education"
 Honorary degrees
 Master of Arts from Dartmouth College, 1962
 Doctor of Science from Rockford College, 1965
 Doctor of Science from Oakland University, 1971

Publications

Books
Tribus published two books; Thermostatics and Thermodynamics, the first textbook basing the laws of thermodynamics on information theory rather than on the classical arguments, and Rational Descriptions, Decisions, and Designs, introducing Bayesian Decision methods into the engineering design process.

He also published Goals and Gaols, a short work in which he illustrated with many historic examples how premature specialization may push students to a dead end, given the fast obsolescence of techniques.

Papers
He published over 100 papers on topics 
 Tribus, Myron (1961). Thermodynamics and Thermostatics: An Introduction to Energy, Information and States of Matter, with Engineering Applications. D. Van Nostrand Company Inc. 
 Tribus, Myron (1969). Rational Descriptions, Decisions and Designs. Pergamon Press Inc. 1969. Reprint 478pp, 1999 at EXPIRA Press, Stockholm. Still available. 
 Levine, Raphael D., and Myron Tribus, eds. The maximum entropy formalism. Cambridge: Mit Press, 1979.
 Tribus, Myron (1989). Deployment flow charting. Quality & Productivity, Inc. ASIN
 Tribus, Myron (1992). Quality first: Selected papers on quality and productivity improvement. National Society of Professional Engineers; 4th ed edition. 
 Tribus, Myron (1992). The Germ theory of management. SPC Press'.

References

External links

  Myron Tribus's Essays enter "Tribus" in search box.
 
 Rational Descriptions, Decisions, and Designs. Reprint, pp.478, 1999 at EXPIRA Press, Stockholm. 

1921 births
2016 deaths
People from San Francisco
University of California, Berkeley alumni
University of California, Los Angeles alumni
General Electric employees
UCLA Henry Samueli School of Engineering and Applied Science faculty
University of Michigan faculty
Thayer School of Engineering faculty
United States Department of Commerce officials
Xerox people
Massachusetts Institute of Technology faculty
Members of the United States National Academy of Engineering
United States Army personnel of World War II
American industrial engineers
American business theorists